Arthur Denis Winston (1908–1980) was an architect and town planner who became Australia's first professor of town planning at the University of Sydney. In 1951 he led the amalgamation of state based planning associations into a national body, of which he became the first president.

Career and works
 Arthur published “Sydney’s Great Experiment: The Progress of the Cumberland County Plan” in 1957. This was an illustrated and independent account of the development of the Cumberland County Plan for general readers.
He acted as a consultant in the planning of Adaminaby and Jindabyn From the 1950s to the 1970s.

References

Architects from Sydney
1908 births
1980 deaths